The Maniqui River is a river of Bolivia.

See also
List of rivers of Bolivia

References
 Rand McNally, The New International Atlas, 1993.
 A Shape-Shifting River in Bolivia at NASA Earth Observatory, 21 December 2016.

Rivers of Beni Department